Catocala timur, the Timur underwing, is a moth of the family Erebidae. It is found in Transcaspia.

The wingspan is about 40 mm.

Subspecies
Catocala timur timur (Transcaspia)
Catocala timur richteri Wiltshire, 1961 (Southern Iran)

References

Moths described in 1907
timur
Moths of Asia